CLIO is the Cryogenic Laser Interferometer Observatory, a prototype detector for gravitational waves. It is testing cryogenic mirror technologies for the Kamioka Gravitational Wave Detector (KAGRA). It is located in Japan.

Overview
CLIO is an optical interferometer with two perpendicular arms each of 100 m length.

CLIO is situated 1000 m underground in the Kamioka Observatory, Gifu Prefecture.

CLIO is one of the science facilities for physics of the Institute for Cosmic Ray Research of the University of Tokyo.

References

Gravitational-wave telescopes
Research in Japan
Astronomical observatories in Japan
Buildings and structures in Gifu Prefecture
Interferometers